Gui Shiyong (February 1935 – 28 November 2003) was a Chinese economist and politician who served as director of the State Council Research Office from 1998 to 2001.

He was a member of the Standing Committee of the 9th and 10th Chinese People's Political Consultative Conference. He was a representative of the 14th and 15th National Congress of the Chinese Communist Party. He was an alternate member of the 13th and 14th Central Committee of the Chinese Communist Party, and a member of the 15th Central Committee of the Chinese Communist Party.

Biography
Gui was born in Hangzhou, Zhejiang, in February 1935. In 1950, he entered the Renmin University of China, majoring in industrial planning. He joined the Chinese Communist Party (CCP) in July 1956. He became an assistant research fellow of the Chinese Academy of Sciences in September 1956, and served until November 1969, when he was sent to the May Seventh Cadre Schools to do farm works in Qianjiang, Hubei. During his term in office, he studied economics under eminent economist Sun Yefang. HisSeventy Articles of Industry and its propaganda materials were criticized as "Big Poisonous Weeds" by the Red Guards.

Starting in March 1973, he successively served as research fellow, deputy director, and director of the State Planning Commission (now National Development and Reform Commission). He was eventually promoted to secretary-general in June 1988. From March 1987 to June 1988, he also served a short term as deputy editor-in-chief of the People's Daily, the mouthpiece of the Chinese Communist Party. In September 1988, he became deputy director of the State Council Research Office, rising to director in March 1998. He concurrently served as vice president of the Chinese Academy of Governance between July 1994 and November 1999.

On 28 November 2003, he died from an illness in Beijing, at the age of 68.

Publications

References

1935 births
2003 deaths
People from Huzhou
Renmin University of China alumni
Chinese economists
People's Republic of China politicians from Zhejiang
Chinese Communist Party politicians from Zhejiang
Members of the Standing Committee of the 9th Chinese People's Political Consultative Conference
Members of the Standing Committee of the 10th Chinese People's Political Consultative Conference
Alternate members of the 13th Central Committee of the Chinese Communist Party
Alternate members of the 14th Central Committee of the Chinese Communist Party
Members of the 15th Central Committee of the Chinese Communist Party